Benjamin Brakoh Boateng Mensah (born 30 December 2002) is an Italian professional footballer who plays as a right back for Peterborough United.

Career
Mensah was educated at Northampton Academy, during which time he played for Aston Villa's academy, before later joining Peterborough United. On 12 November 2019, Mensah made his debut for Peterborough in a 2–1 EFL Trophy win against rivals Cambridge United. He signed a two-and-a-half year professional contract with the club on 29 December 2020, one day before his 18th birthday.

Personal life
Born in Seriate, Italy, Mensah is of Ghanaian descent.

Career statistics

References

2002 births
Living people
People from Seriate
Italian people of Ghanaian descent
Italian sportspeople of African descent
Association football defenders
Italian footballers
Peterborough United F.C. players
Sportspeople from the Province of Bergamo
Footballers from Lombardy